The Maltese Premier League 2009–10 was the 95th season of the Maltese Premier League, the top-tier football league in Malta. Hibernians were the defending champions. The season began on 21 August 2009 and ended on 5 May 2010. It was won by Birkirkara, who became the league winners for the third time in their history.

Promotion and relegation from 2008–09
Ħamrun Spartans were relegated to the First Division after finishing in last place of the relegation pool. They were joined by Msida Saint-Joseph, who lost a decision match against Tarxien Rainbows on penalties.

Promoted from the First Division were Dingli Swallows as champions and Vittoriosa Stars as runners-up. However, after playing one match in the Premier League, Vittoriosa Stars were relegated to the First Division due to a decision by the Board to Investigate Corrupt Practices. A month later, Marsaxlokk received the same punishment, immediate relegation to the First Division due to their involvement in a bribery scandal. Rather than continue the season with eight clubs, the Maltese FA declared that both the Premier League and First Division would be composed of 10 clubs each. In a meeting on 17 September 2009, it was decided that Msida Saint-Joseph and Ħamrun Spartans would play in the Premier League this season, despite both being relegated last season.

Training Grounds and Locations

Competition modus
The Premier League consists of two rounds. In the First Round, every team will play each opponent twice, once home and once away, for a total of 18 games. The league will then be split in two pools. Earned points will be halved (rounded up if necessary). Teams that will finish in positions 1–6 compete in the "Championship Pool" and teams finishing in positions 7–10 play in the "Relegation Pool".

First phase

League table

Results

Second phase

Top Six
<onlyinclude>

Europa league and Third Place play-off
Due to finishing equal on points, Qormi and Sliema played a play-off match to determine Maltese second UEFA Europa League participant for the 2010–11 season and finish third.

Play-Out
<onlyinclude>

Top scorers

References

External links
 Premier League official page
 UEFA website

Maltese Premier League seasons
Malta
1